Helene Hansen (born 21 May 1968) is a Danish sailor. She competed in the Tornado event at the 2000 Summer Olympics.

References

External links
 

1968 births
Living people
Danish female sailors (sport)
Olympic sailors of Denmark
Sailors at the 2000 Summer Olympics – Tornado
Place of birth missing (living people)